Barysiai Airport  is an airport in Barysiai, a village in the Joniškis district municipality of Šiauliai County in northern Lithuania. From 1959 to 1992 it was a civil airport serving the city of Šiauliai.

Facilities

See also
 Šiauliai International Airport (IATA: SQQ, ICAO: EYSA)

References

Airports in Lithuania
Buildings and structures in Šiauliai County